Andorinha is a municipality in the Brazilian state of Bahia.  Its estimated population in 2020 was 14,503.

References

Municipalities in Bahia